Bryan Hall (born September 12, 1988) is an American football linebacker who is currently a free agent. In 2011, he signed with the Baltimore Ravens as an undrafted free agent. He played College football at Arkansas State. He has also been a member of the Hamilton Tiger-Cats and Toronto Argonauts of the CFL.

Early years
Hall attended Tilghman High School in Paducah, Kentucky, where he was a four-year letterman and played linebacker in junior and senior years.

College career
Hall played four years at Arkansas State. He finished with 124 tackles, 16 sacks, 4 forced fumbles and an interception.

In 2007 (freshman year), he finished the season with 10 tackles.

In 2008, (sophomore year), he was selected as the team's Most Improved Defensive player at the end of spring camp. He finished the season with 39 tackles, 6 sacks and an interception. On August 30, 2008, he recorded 5 tackles and a sack against Texas A&M as Arkansas State won the game, 18–14.

In 2009 (junior year), he was selected to the Second-team All-Sun Conference. He finished the year with 30 tackles and 2.5 sacks. On September 5, 2009, he recorded 4 tackles and 1.5 sacks against Mississippi Valley State as Arkansas State won in a blowout, 61–0. On September 26, 2009, he had 3 tackles and a sack against Troy but Arkansas State lost, 30–27.

In 2010 (senior year), Hall finished the season with 45 tackles, 8.5 sacks and 3 forced fumbles. On September 11, 2010, he had a 4 tackles and a sack against Louisiana-Lafayette as Arkansas State lost the game, 31–24. On September 18, 2010, in a regular-season game against Louisiana-Monroe in which he had 3 tackles and 1.5 sacks as Arkansas State won, 34–20. On October 2, 2010, he had 5 tackles and a sack against Louisville but Arkansas State lost the game, 34–24. On October 23, 2010, he had 6 tackles and 2 sacks against Florida Atlantic as Arkansas State won, 37–16. On November 2, 2010, in a regular-season game against Middle Tennessee State in which he had 7 tackles, a sack and 2 forced fumbles as Arkansas State got the victory, 51–24.

Professional career

Baltimore Ravens
On July 28, 2011, he signed with the Baltimore Ravens. On September 3, 2011, he was waived. On September 4, 2011, he re-signed with the team to join the practice squad. On September 1, 2012, he officially made the 53 man roster. On October 21, 2012, he made his debut along with his teammate DeAngelo Tyson against the Houston Texans.

Before the 2013 season, Hall was moved from defensive end to inside linebacker. On August 25, 2013, he was waived by the Ravens.

Hamilton Tiger-Cats
Hall signed with the Hamilton Tiger-Cats (CFL) on May 31, 2014. In his first year in the CFL, he contributed 35 tackles and 4 sacks. Statistically, Hall had a similar 2015 season, compiling 35 tackles and 3 sacks.

Toronto Argonauts
Hall signed with the Toronto Argonauts (CFL) in February 2016. In 17 games he contributed 33 tackles, 4 quarterback sacks and 1 forced fumble. Following the season he was not re-signed by the Argos and became a free agent on February 14, 2017.

Calgary Stampeders 
Bryan Hall signed with the Calgary Stampeders (CFL) on March 16, 2017.

References

External links

 Arkansas State bio
 Hamilton Tiger-Cats bio 
 Baltimore Ravens bio

1988 births
Living people
African-American players of American football
African-American players of Canadian football
American football defensive tackles
Arkansas State Red Wolves football players
Baltimore Ravens players
Canadian football defensive linemen
Hamilton Tiger-Cats players
Paducah Tilghman High School alumni
People from Carbondale, Illinois
Players of American football from Kentucky
Sportspeople from Paducah, Kentucky
21st-century African-American sportspeople
20th-century African-American people